The 1948–49 season was Real Madrid Club de Fútbol's 46th season in existence and the club's 17th consecutive season in the top flight of Spanish football.

Summary
During summer Bernabeu reinforced the team with several players including young star midfielder Pablo Olmedo, midfielder Miguel Muñoz and top goalscorer Pahiño came from Celta Vigo, and midfielder Jesus Narro was bought from Real Murcia. In the league the squad reached the first spot after ten matchdays, but then collapsed to ultimately finish in the 3rd spot. New arrival forward Pahiño played in a superb form scoring 21 goals. In June, the club advanced to the 1948–49 Copa del Generalísimo round of 16 where they were defeated by Atletico de Bilbao in a playoff game after two draws.

Squad

Transfers

Competitions

La Liga

Position by round

League table

Matches

Copa del Generalísimo

Round of 16

Statistics

Squad statistics

Players statistics

References

Real Madrid CF seasons
Real Madrid CF